Brown School is a private, nondenominational elementary, middle school and high school in Schenectady, New York in the United States. It provides instruction for about 300 students in grades one through eight. It also offers nursery and kindergarten programs.

History

In September 1893, Miss Helen "Nellie" Churchill Brown opened the Brown School in the front two rooms of her family home at 237 Liberty Street, with 12 pupils, age 8-11.

During the early 1900s, Miss Brown's School grew quickly and moved several times, to Park Avenue, 1230 Rugby Road, and eventually in 1906 to 1184 Rugby Road within the G.E. Realty Plot.  A building was constructed on land donated by the Schenectady Realty Company, as part of its planned community. For many years, Brown School primarily educated children who lived in the G.E. Realty Plot.  The area behind the school, an old quarry known affectionately as the "Dump", was the scene of Maypole dances, "Olympic Games", and ski lessons.  Each winter the Dump was flooded and served as a skating pond for the exclusive use of Plot residents.  The fire hydrant installed for this purpose is still visible today.

In 1920 Miss Brown retired, the school's operation was taken over by the Parents' Association, and Brown School received its Charter from the Board of Regents.  In 1924 the corporation received the title of the school building from the Rice family and others.  In 1927 the school's curriculum expanded to include high school students, and the house next door to 1184 Rugby Road was purchased to accommodate the lower school.

By the early 1930s there were 90 students between the two buildings.  Only girls were allowed in the upper grades, known as Miss Brown's Seminary for Young Ladies.  Extracurricular activities included drama, glee club, bicycling, horseback riding and skiing.  The girls competed in field hockey and basketball as members of either the Brown or Orange Team.  The Babbler was the school newspaper.  By 1938, with only seven students in the graduating class, retrenchment became necessary.  The upper school was eliminated, and the second building was sold.

Brown School's enrollment in 1973 was 40 children, from nursery through grade six, of whom 10 were not born in the United States. Brown School only went up to second grade by the early 1980s, with an enrollment of 80 students.  In 1984 the school began to expand at the rate of one grade level each year.  The elementary school moved to space in the Van Antwerp School on Story Avenue and remained there for seven years.  During that time the nursery classes operated from the Rugby Road building.  Enrollment gradually increased to about 125 students in kindergarten through fifth grade, and to 65 students in the nursery program.

In 1991 the upper grades (K-5) moved to a facility on Eleanor Street, with the advantage of being the sole tenant and manager of its own space.

The expansion to include Middle School was begun in 1996, making it essential to find a permanent home for the nursery through eighth grade school. During the 1996-1997 school year Brown School's Board of Trustees arranged for the purchase of a  facility at 150 Corlaer Avenue, which used to be Notre Dame High School and New Life Academy. During that time the location on Rugby Road was sold.  By 1999 Brown School graduated its first eighth grade class from the 150 Corlaer location.

 the school was Schenectady's only independent non-sectarian school.
As of the 2017-2018 school year, Brown has its first high school class, including three students. This class is starting as freshman, and there has been NO graduating high school students yet. (As of 2017) Brown School has also completed construction on a new media center.

External links
  Brown School official site

Educational institutions established in 1893
Private elementary schools in New York (state)
Private middle schools in New York (state)
Buildings and structures in Schenectady, New York
Private schools in Capital District (New York)
Schools in Schenectady County, New York
1893 establishments in New York (state)